James Francis McCarthy (born July 9, 1942) is an American prelate of the Roman Catholic Church who served as an auxiliary bishop of the Archdiocese of New York in New York City from 1999 to 2002.  McCarthy was forced to resign his post in 2002 after he admitted having sexual affairs with adult women.

Biography

Early life 
Born on July 9, 1942, in Mount Kisco, New York, McCarthy attended Archbishop Stepinac High School in White Plains, New York.

McCarthy was ordained to the priesthood on June 1, 1968, for the Archdiocese of New York.  In 1984, he became a priest-secretary to Cardinal John O'Connor, accompanying him on travels in the United States and other countries.

Auxiliary Bishop of New York 
On May 22, 1999, Pope John Paul II appointed McCarthy as titular bishop of Verrona and auxiliary bishop of the Archdiocese of New York.  He was consecrated on June 29, 1999 by Cardinal O'Connor.  As auxiliary bishop, McCarthy was serving as pastor of St. Elizabeth Ann Seton Parish in Shrub Oak, New York while overseeing northern Westchester, Putnam and Rockland Counties.

In June 2002, Cardinal Edward Egan received a letter from a woman who claimed to have had a consensual affair with McCarthy 20 years earlier when he was assigned as a priest at St. Benedict's Parish in the Bronx.  When confronted with the letter, McCarthy said the allegation was true and that he had consensual sexual contact with other women also.  At that point, the archdiocese removed him from all of his ministerial duties.  

It was later confirmed that McCarthy had revealed the affairs 15 years earlier during confession.  Many of his former parishioner and friends in the clergy felt that McCarthy had been treated unfairly by the church, that he was the victim of a power struggle between Egan supporters and supporters of O'Connor, who died in 2000.

On June 15, 2002, John Paul II accepted McCarthy's letter of resignation as auxiliary bishop for the Archdiocese of New York.

See also
 

 Catholic Church hierarchy
 Catholic Church in the United States
 Historical list of the Catholic bishops of the United States
 List of Catholic bishops of the United States
 Lists of patriarchs, archbishops, and bishops

References

External links
 Roman Catholic Archdiocese of New York Official Site

1942 births
Living people
People from Mount Kisco, New York
20th-century Roman Catholic bishops in the United States
People of the Roman Catholic Archdiocese of New York
21st-century Roman Catholic bishops in the United States